Sivri may refer to:

Sivri, Polatlı, village in the District of Polatlı, Ankara Province, Turkey
Yücel Sivri (born 1961), Turkish journalist, poet, writer and translator